Anne Muraya is a Kenyan accountant, businesswoman, and corporate executive who was appointed as the chief executive officer of Deloitte East Africa, effective 1 June 2022. Up until then, she served as the Africa Managing Partner for Responsible Business and Public Policy at Deloitte. She concurrently worked as the audit leader for East Africa. In her new position, Muraya oversees the company's business in eight countries, namely: Burundi, Ethiopia, Kenya, Rwanda, Somalia, South Sudan, Tanzania and Uganda. She is the first female executive to serve in that position, in the history of the firm.

Background and education
Muraya is a Kenyan national. She holds a Bachelor of Education (B.Ed.) degree in Mathematics and Chemistry, awarded by Kenyatta University in 1994. She is a certified public accountant and is a member of the Institute of Certified Public Accountants of Kenya (ICPAK), the Institute of Certified Public Accountants of Uganda (ICPAU) and Institute of Certified Public Accountants of Rwanda (ICPAR).

Career
In 1994, Muraya joined Deloitte as an auditor, in their office in Nairobi, Kenya's capital city. Over the years, she rose through the ranks and was in 2017, appointed the first female "audit leader", in Deloitte's East African region. Later, she was appointed as Managing Partner for Responsible Business and Public Policy for Deloitte's Africa region. There too, she was the first female to serve in that role.

Family
She is the mother of two adult children, one son and one daughter.

Other considerations
Muraya is a member of Deloitte Africa Audit Executive Committee (Exco). EXCO sets the strategic direction of the Audit & Assurance business for the African region and monitors the execution of that strategy. She is also a member of the Deloitte Global Advisory Council (Council). This group comprises 30 Deloitte partners, selected globally to advise the Deloitte Global chief executive officer.

See also
 Rita Kavashe
 Ruth Doreen Mutebe

References

External links
 Personal Profile at LinkedIn.com

Living people
1970 births
Kenyan accountants
21st-century Kenyan businesswomen
21st-century Kenyan businesspeople
Kenyan chief executives
Kikuyu people